Penheale Manor is a grade I listed manor house and historic building one mile north of Egloskerry, Cornwall.

History
The manor was mentioned as one of 284 manors in Cornwall by the Domesday Book of 1086. The current manor house occupies a medieval site, but was built in the early 17th century. It can be dated to c. 1620-1640. There were alterations in the 18th century. The Rev. Henry Addington Simcoe, son of John Graves Simcoe, purchased the estate in 1830 and was curate of Egloskerry. He married twice and had eleven children, and wrote and published many books from his own printing press at Penheale. Norman Colville purchased Penheale in the 1920s and made significant alterations, with the help of Sir Edwin Lutyens. His additions are largely to the south, and reportedly contain a stair of a similar design, but smaller scale, to that of Castle Drogo. The manor is a Grade I listed building. The gatehouse, stables, and the gate, with its gatepiers and attached garden wall are also listed at Grade I.

References

External links
Parks & Gardens UK: Penheale Manor
Launceston Then!: Penheale

Grade I listed buildings in Cornwall
Gardens in Cornwall
Country houses in Cornwall
Grade I listed houses
Grade II listed parks and gardens in Cornwall